Seydiler District is a district of the Kastamonu Province of Turkey. Its seat is the town of Seydiler. Its area is 233 km2, and its population is 4,289 (2021).

Composition
There is one municipality in Seydiler District:
 Seydiler

There are 15 villages in Seydiler District:

 Çerçiler
 Çiğilerik
 Çırdak
 Emreler
 Ericek
 Imrenler
 Incesu
 Karaçavuş
 Kepez
 Mancılık
 Odabaşı
 Sabuncular
 Şalgam
 Üyük
 Yolyaka

References

Districts of Kastamonu Province